The Dean of Belfast is the senior official of St Anne's Cathedral in the city of Belfast, Northern Ireland and head of the Chapter, its governing body.

List of deans of Belfast
 1894–1899: Henry Stewart O’Hara; first dean of Belfast (afterwards Bishop of Cashel and Waterford, 1900)
 1899–1903: Charles Frederick D’Arcy; became Bishop of Ossory, Ferns and Leighlin, and subsequently Bishop of Down, Connor and Dromore, briefly Archbishop of Dublin, and finally Archbishop of Armagh
 1903–1911: John Joseph Robinson
 1911–1919: Charles Thornton Primrose Grierson (afterwards Bishop of Down, Connor and Dromore, 1919)
 1919–1926: Thomas Gibson George Collins (afterwards Bishop of Meath, 1926)
 1926–1932: Henry Robert Brett
 1932–1945: William Shaw Kerr
 1945–1956: Robert Cyril Hamilton Glover Elliott (afterwards Bishop of Connor, 1956)
 1956–1970: Cuthbert Peacocke (afterwards Bishop of Derry and Raphoe, 1970)
 1970–1985: Samuel Bennett Crooks
 1985–2001: Jack Shearer
 2001–2011: Houston McKelvey
 2011-2017: John Mann
 2018–present: Stephen Forde

References

[

 
Belfast